Kurahashi Tameike Dam is an earthen dam located in Nara prefecture in Japan. The dam is used for agriculture. The catchment area of the dam is 13.4 km2. The dam impounds about 19  ha of land when full and can store 1714 thousand cubic meters of water.

References

Dams in Nara Prefecture
1956 establishments in Japan